Sunway Putra Mall, previously known as The Mall or Putra Place, is a shopping mall located along Jalan Putra in Kuala Lumpur, Malaysia. It is situated across the street from the Putra World Trade Centre (now WTC KL) and the Seri Pacific Hotel.

History

The complex, known as "The Mall" at that time, was built by Metroplex Holdings Sdn. Bhd. (MHSB) and opened on 12 June 1987 by Mahathir bin Mohamad, the fourth prime minister at the time, who personally buried a time capsule that will be unearthed after a century, in 2087. The capsule contains a message written by Mahathir and is addressed to the citizens of the future.

At the time, The Mall was the largest shopping centre in Malaysia and was built to attract more shoppers from Singapore to Kuala Lumpur. It was built at cost of RM289 million and it was launched by a light show. The complex once had Malaysia's first Yaohan store which operated from the mall's opening in 1987 until 1997 before its bankruptcy in Japan.

In March 2011, Putra Place, which consists of The Mall, Legend Hotel (now known as Sunway Putra Hotel) and an office block, was acquired by Sunway REIT under Sunway Group for RM513.94 million in a public auction and they spent RM307 million in refurbishment costs. The refurbishment started in May 2013 and reopened as "Sunway Putra Mall" on 28 May 2015. Sunway Putra Mall repositioned itself as an urban-chic lifestyle mall and houses 300 outlets.

Public transit

A pedestrian bridge that connects PWTC LRT station, Putra Komuter station, Putra World Trade Centre, Seri Pacific Hotel, Putra Bus Terminal and Sunway Putra Mall is made available to allow commuters and pedestrians to move with ease.

The mall also has sufficient parking lots to cater for the shoppers and office workers around this area (Sunway Putra Mall parking rate)

References

External links 

 

Shopping malls in Kuala Lumpur
Shopping malls established in 1987
1987 establishments in Malaysia
Sunway Group